= Light station =

Light station may refer to:

- Lighthouse
- Lightvessel
